Daily Lives of High School Boys is a 2011-12 slice of life Japanese anime series  based on the manga series of the same name written and illustrated by Yasunobu Yamauchi. The story revolves around the daily lives of Tadakuni, Hidenori Tabata and Yoshitake Tanaka of Sanada North Boys High school and their various interactions with other students of and around their school and their hilarious coming of age endeavors. Each episode is divided into a series of shorts, with each short being only a few minutes in length.

The anime is produced by Sunrise and directed by Shinji Takamatsu along with character designs by Yoshinori Yumoto, editing by Emi Onodera and soundtrack music composed by Audio Highs. Eight five-minute pilot episodes were released for streaming on Niconico between November 3 and December 22, 2011 prior to the television premiere of the full-length anime which also included them. The anime premiered on TV Tokyo on January 9, 2012 followed by later airings on AT-X, Bandai Channel, TVA, TVO and online streaming on Niconico. The series was eventually picked up by Hulu for online streaming in the United States.

The series was licensed by NIS America for a home media release in North America and by Hanabee Entertainment for release in Australia. Happinet released the series in Japan on 6 Blu-ray and DVD volumes beginning on April 3, 2012.

"Capsule" by Mix Speakers, Inc is used as the insert song of episode 3.

Episode list

Pilot episodes

TV episodes

Home media 
Happinet released the series in Japan on 6 Blu-ray and DVD volumes between April 3 and September 4, 2012. NIS America released the complete series in a 2-disc Blu-ray set with English subtitles on August 6, 2013. Hanabee Entertainment released the complete series on a single DVD volume in Australia on July 31, 2013.

References

External links 
Official anime website 

Daily Lives of High School Boys